The Indiana Hoosiers men's basketball team represents Indiana University Bloomington in NCAA Division I college basketball and competes in the Big Ten Conference. The Hoosiers play at Simon Skjodt Assembly Hall on the Branch McCracken Court in Bloomington, Indiana on the Indiana University Bloomington campus. Indiana has won five NCAA Championships in men's basketball (1940, 1953, 1976, 1981, 1987) – the first two under coach Branch McCracken and the latter three under Bob Knight. For forty-seven years and counting, Indiana's 1976 squad remains the last undefeated NCAA men's basketball champion.

The Hoosiers are sixth in NCAA Tournament appearances (41), seventh in NCAA Tournament victories (68), tied for eighth in Final Four appearances (8), and 10th in overall victories. The Hoosiers have won 22 Big Ten Conference Championships and have the best winning percentage in conference games at nearly 60 percent. No team has had more All-Big Ten selections than the Hoosiers with 53. The Hoosiers also rank eighth in all-time AP poll appearances (576) and sixth in the number of weeks spent ranked No. 1 (54). Every four-year men's basketball letterman from 1973 to 2019 earned at least one trip to the NCAA basketball tournament.

A 2019 study listed Indiana as the fifth most valuable collegiate basketball program in the country. Indiana has ranked in the top 20 nationally in men's basketball attendance every season since Assembly Hall opened in 1972, and often in the top five.

Indiana has two main rivalries including in-state, against the Purdue Boilermakers (see Indiana–Purdue rivalry), and out-of-state, against the Kentucky Wildcats (see Indiana–Kentucky rivalry).

Traditions

Candy striped warm-up pants
Indiana players wear warm-up pants that are striped red and white, like the stripes of a candy cane. They were first worn by the team in the 1970s under head coach Bob Knight. At the time they were in keeping with the fashion trends of the 1970s, and a tribute to the Harlem Globetrotters who started the trend, but despite changing styles they have since become an iconic part of playing for Indiana. IU star guard Steve Alford said, "As you watch television and you watch the IU games, that's the first thing you saw, was the team run out in the candy stripes. So when you finally got to put those on, those are pretty special." Rusty Stillions, Director of Indiana's Equipment Operations, said the pants were originally available only for team members. However, changes in licensing agreements permitted the general public to buy them as well. They have since become a staple at games and other Indiana basketball events.

Simple game jerseys

The team is widely noted for its simple game jerseys. Unlike most schools, Indiana does not have players' names on the back of jerseys that players wear on the court. The notion behind the nameless jerseys is that players play for the team name on the front, not the individual's name on the back. In keeping with Indiana's longstanding principle of putting team over player, the Hoosiers have never retired any jersey numbers. Adidas is the current outfitter of Indiana athletics.

When coach Mike Davis succeeded Bob Knight, he suggested adding names to the jerseys.  However, the Hoosiers' minimalist look had become such a part of the program's brand that the proposal was dropped after considerable backlash from fans. Despite the long tradition behind the jerseys, they have undergone some slight changes over the years. The school's colors are cream and crimson, but in the 1970s Knight and football coach Lee Corso started using uniforms that were more scarlet or bright red. During the same time, cream gave way almost universally to white. But those colors reverted mostly to cream and crimson in the early 2000s, after then-athletics director Michael McNeely decided that the team uniforms needed to reflect the school's official colors of cream and crimson.

William Tell Overture
During the third time-out of every second half, the Indiana Big Red Basketball Band performs the William Tell Overture with cheerleaders racing around the court carrying myriad flags that spell out "Indiana Hoosiers." Indiana Assistant Director for Facilities, Chuck Crabb, said the tradition began in about 1979 or 1980. Sportscaster Billy Packer called it "the greatest college timeout in the country."

"Mop Lady" advertisement
In 1971, Indiana Farm Bureau Insurance became the sole sponsor of Indiana and Purdue games on WTTV.  During the mid-1970s, the State Farm Indiana Legends ads included a lady named "Martha" sweeping the floors of Assembly Hall while whistling and singing the school's fight song, "Indiana, Our Indiana."  It ran as the introduction to Indiana basketball broadcasts for 30 years. Upon Indiana's firing of Bob Knight, Farm Bureau pulled the ad. In 2009 new coach Tom Crean resurrected the tradition and had "Martha" appear at the "Midnight Madness" festivities to begin the season. Because the actress who had appeared in the original ads was unavailable, singer Sheila Stephen stepped in as the new Martha.  Starting with the 2010–11 season, video of the original ad was shown at home games after the National Anthem and right before tip off.  In recent years, the ad has been shown just before the Hoosiers take the court.

History

Early years (1900–1924)

Indiana fielded its first men's basketball team in the 1900–01 season, posting a 1–4 ledger under coach James H. Horne. In their first game the Hoosiers traveled to Indianapolis and lost to Butler 17–20. Indiana's first victory was a 26–17 win over Wabash College that same year.

In 1917 the Hoosiers began playing their games at the Men's Gymnasium. After the first few games there, spectators complained that they could not see the game because of opaque wooden backboards. Therefore, new backboards were installed that contained one-and-a-half inch thick plate glass allowing fans to see games without an obstructed view. As a result, it was the first facility (thus the Hoosiers were the first team) in the country to use glass backboards.

Everett Dean era (1924–1938)
IU's first great head coach, Everett Dean, was at first a standout player who garnered IU's first All-America honors in 1921. In 1924, Dean signed on as the full-time head coach of his alma mater. Under Dean, the Hoosiers would elevate their play to new heights, winning their first-ever share of the Big Ten Conference title in 1926, defeating Wisconsin 35–20. The Hoosiers also won conference championships in 1928 and 1936. Four All-Americans helped lead the Hoosiers in this era: Jim Strickland, Branch McCracken (later coach), Vern Huffman, and Ken Gunning. Dean coached Indiana until 1938. He is the only coach named to both the Naismith Basketball Hall of Fame and the College Baseball Hall of Fame.

Branch McCracken era (1938–1965)
When Dean left for Stanford, the popular selection to succeed him was Branch McCracken. McCracken was another young alumnus and former player under Everett Dean. Because of his fast-breaking style of play, McCracken's teams would earn the nickname "Hurryin' Hoosiers".

McCracken's first IU team was led by All-American Ernie Andres, later a McCracken basketball assistant. In McCracken's first year, the team finished 17–3, splitting games with both Purdue and eventual NCAA runnerup Ohio State. The following year the 1939–40 NCAA title team, led by All-American Marvin Huffman, would take Indiana to unprecedented success: an NCAA title and a record (at the time) 20 wins. The 20–3 record by that team would not be bested for another 13 years until broken again by Indiana. At their home court at The Fieldhouse, Indiana saw six perfect seasons including a 24-game unbeaten home winning streak from 1938 to 1941. In 1948, McCracken was responsible for recruiting Bill Garrett who became the first African American player in Big Ten varsity basketball history.

The Hoosiers' 1952–53 NCAA title team – led by Bobby Leonard, Dick Farley, and three-time All-American Don Schlundt – won the Big Ten and went on to win the NCAA championship by defeating reigning champions Kansas by one point. The Hoosiers would again win the Big Ten the following season in 1953–54. Just a few years later the team won back-to-back conference championships in 1956–57 and 1957–58 behind the leadership of two-time All-American Archie Dees. A few years later the Hoosiers were led by two-time All-American Walt Bellamy, one of the few African-American players in college basketball at the time.

In the fall of 1960 the Indiana Hoosiers football program was hit with devastating NCAA sanctions that impacted every varsity sport at the school, including basketball. Although the violations only occurred within the football program, all Hoosier varsity sports were barred from postseason play during the probationary period. The sanctions drastically undermined the ability of coaches to lure talented players to Indiana. Nevertheless, McCracken did manage to successfully recruit twins Dick Van Arsdale and Tom Van Arsdale, both of whom would earn All-America honors in 1965.

McCracken ultimately coached IU for 23 years, amassing 364 wins and 210 Big Ten wins. His teams also won four regular season Big Ten titles and went to the NCAA tournament four times, winning two national titles. He was inducted into the National Basketball Hall of Fame and the court now at Assembly Hall is named in his honor.

Lou Watson era (1965–1971)
Sandwiched between two iconic coaches in Branch McCracken and Bob Knight, McCracken's longtime assistant and former lead scorer Lou Watson coached Indiana from 1965 through 1971, with a leave of absence in 1970 where Jerry Oliver stepped in as acting head coach. The 1966–67 team, which won a Big Ten championship, was known as the "Cardiac Kids" because of their many heart-stopping finishes. During the 1970–1971 season the Hoosiers were led by All-American George McGinnis. Watson ended his Indiana coaching career with a 61–60 record.

Bob Knight era (1971–2000)

During Bob Knight's 29 years as head coach at Indiana, the Hoosiers won 662 games, including 22 seasons of 20 or more wins, while losing but 239, a remarkable .735 winning percentage. In 24 NCAA tournament appearances at Indiana, Hoosier teams under Bob Knight won 42 of 63 games (.667), winning titles in 1975–76, 1980–81, and 1986–87, while finishing third in 1973 and 1992. While at Indiana, a total of 23 different players under Coach Knight's tutelage received All-American and All-Big Ten honors. For 10-consecutive seasons, a player made the All-American Academic and All-Big Ten Academic Teams, and a total of 18 players were so honored. Nine Indiana players won 10 Big Ten Most Valuable Player honors.

In 1972–73, Knight's second year as coach, Indiana won the Big Ten championship and reached the Final Four, but lost to UCLA. The following season, 1973–74, Indiana once again captured a Big Ten title. In the two following seasons, 1974–75 and 1975–76, the Hoosiers were undefeated in the regular season and won 37-consecutive Big Ten games, including two more Big Ten championships. The 1974–75 Hoosiers swept the entire Big Ten by an average of 22.8 points per game. However, in an 83–82 win against Purdue they lost consensus All-American forward Scott May to a broken left arm. With May's injury keeping him to 7 minutes of play, the No. 1 Hoosiers lost to Kentucky 92–90 in the Mideast Regional. The Hoosiers were so dominant that four starters – Scott May, Steve Green, Kent Benson and Quinn Buckner – would make the five-man All-Big Ten team. The following season, 1975–76, the Hoosiers went the entire season and 1976 NCAA tournament without a single loss, beating Michigan 86–68 in the title game. Indiana remains the last school to accomplish this feat.

Behind the play of Mike Woodson Indiana won the 1979 NIT championship. The 1979–80 Hoosiers, led by Woodson and Isiah Thomas, won the Big Ten championship and advanced to the 1980 Sweet Sixteen. The following season, in 1980–81, Thomas and the Hoosiers once again won a conference title and won the 1981 NCAA tournament, the school's fourth national title. In 1982–1983, with the strong play of Uwe Blab and All-Americans Ted Kitchel and Randy Wittman, the No. 1 ranked Hoosiers were favorites to win another national championship. However, with an injury to Kitchel mid-season, the Hoosiers' prospects were grim. Knight asked for fan support to rally around the team and, when the team ultimately won the Big Ten title, he ordered that a banner be hung for the team in Assembly Hall as a tribute to the fans, who he credited with inspiring the team to win its final three home games. Nevertheless, in the tournament Kitchel's absence was felt and the team lost to Kentucky in the 1983 Sweet Sixteen.

The 1985–86 Hoosiers were profiled in a best-selling book A Season on the Brink. To write it Knight granted author John Feinstein almost unprecedented access to the Indiana basketball program, as well as insights into Knight's private life. The following season, in 1986–87, the Hoosiers were led by All-American Steve Alford and captured a share of the Big Ten title. The team won Indiana's fifth national championship against Syracuse in the 1987 NCAA tournament with a game-winning jump shot by Keith Smart with five seconds of play remaining in the championship game. In the 1988–1989 season the Hoosiers were led by All-American Jay Edwards and won a Big Ten championship.

From 1990 to 1991 through 1992–93, the Hoosiers posted 87 victories, the most by any Big Ten team in a three-year span, breaking the mark of 86 set by Knight's Indiana teams of 1974–76. Teams from these three seasons spent all but two of the 53 poll weeks in the top 10, and 38 of them in the top 5. They captured two Big Ten crowns in 1990–91 and 1992–93, and during the 1991–92 season reached the Final Four. During the 1992–93 season, the 31–4 Hoosiers finished the season at the top of the AP Poll, but were defeated by Kansas in the Elite Eight. Teams from this era included Greg Graham, Pat Knight, All-Americans Damon Bailey and Alan Henderson, and National Player of the Year Calbert Cheaney.

Throughout the mid and late 1990s Knight and the Hoosiers continued to experience success with superior play from All-Americans Brian Evans and A. J. Guyton. The Hoosiers won a minimum of 19 games and played in the NCAA tournament each year. However, 1993 would be Knight's last conference championship and 1994 would be his last trip to the Sweet Sixteen. Moreover, his aggressive and combative actions and communication often brought as much controversy to the school as success. Allegations of abuse, along with his reputation and a strained relationship with then-University President Myles Brand, resulted in Knight's controversial dismissal in 2000.

Mike Davis era (2000–2006)
Following Bob Knight's tumultuous exit from Indiana, assistant Mike Davis took over as interim head coach in the fall of 2000. In his first season, Davis led a team featuring All-Americans Kirk Haston and Jared Jeffries to a 21–13 record. The following year, in the 2001–02 season, Davis was named the permanent coach. That year the Hoosiers captured a share of the Big Ten championship and made an unexpected trip to the 2002 NCAA championship game. But after the Hoosiers failed to make the NCAA tournament in 2004 and 2005 (for the first time since 1985), criticism of Davis grew. Following months of speculation, he announced his resignation in February 2006, saying the basketball program needed to move on with a new coach. He remained with the team for the rest of the 2006 season before leaving.

Kelvin Sampson era (2006–2008)
On March 28, 2006, Oklahoma head coach Kelvin Sampson was named coach of the Hoosiers, despite a history of violating NCAA rules and sanctions imposed on him. Sampson fielded competitive teams and scored a major recruiting victory by persuading in-state star Eric Gordon to sign with Indiana. The Hoosiers, with Gordon and forward D.J. White, were considered one of the better teams during the 2007–2008 season. However, in October 2007 Sampson was found to have violated rules again, this time by engaging in a 3-way phone conversation with a recruit. Indiana punished Sampson by denying him a previously scheduled $500,000 raise, firing one of his assistant coaches, and taking away one of his scholarships for the 2008–2009 season.

In early February 2008 the NCAA informed Indiana that Sampson had "knowingly violated telephone recruiting restrictions and then lied about it." After launching another internal investigation, Indiana officials announced just 14 days later that Sampson accepted a $750,000 buyout of his contract and resigned as the men's basketball coach. Former player and assistant coach Dan Dakich was named interim coach for the remainder of the season. A number of college basketball pundits believed that Sampson's tenure at Indiana had effectively ended once the allegations broke. Sports Illustrated college basketball columnist Seth Davis noted that the NCAA had given Indiana 90 days to respond to the notice of allegations. Indiana officials said their internal investigation would only take a week, leading Davis to believe that they had already decided Sampson was guilty.  ESPN's Mark Schlabach suggested that the only reason Indiana did not fire Sampson right away was because his contract did not allow the school to suspend him immediately. He believed Indiana was trying to find a way not to honor his contract and stay out of the courtroom.  ESPN's Pat Forde said that Sampson's departure was "preordained" the moment the NCAA sent out its notice of allegations, and suggested that Sampson would never return to Division I.

In November 2008, the NCAA imposed a three-year probation on the basketball program and upheld the school's self-imposed sanctions stemming from the actions of Sampson and his staff. Earlier, IU president Michael McRobbie privately told the NCAA infractions committee that Sampson betrayed his trust as Indiana's coach, and demonstrated that his hiring had been "a risk that should not have been taken."

Tom Crean era (2008–2017)
On April 1, 2008, Tom Crean was hired as head coach and inherited a thoroughly depleted team. Between Crean's hiring and the start of the 2008–09 season, freshman Eric Gordon opted to leave early for the NBA and star forward DJ White graduated. Two other players transferred, one player was dismissed from the team and two others previously dismissed by Dakich were not allowed to return.  As a result, Crean began with a roster consisting of two walk-ons who had scored a combined 36 points in their careers. Crean's first three seasons saw losing records of 6–25 (the worst in school history), 10–21, and 12–20.

The 2011–2012 season was a watershed one for Crean and the program. The arrival of Indiana Mr. Basketball Cody Zeller brought higher expectations for year four. The team earned wins over the #1 ranked Kentucky, the #2 ranked Ohio State, and #5 ranked Michigan State. This made Indiana the first Big 10 program to knock off the #1 and #2 ranked teams in the same season since 1991 and the first IU squad ever to defeat three programs ranked in the top five in the regular season.  The Hoosiers finished the season with a 27–9 record, 5th in the Big Ten. The fifteen game win improvement in 2011–2012 was the largest single turnaround in the NCAA that season.  Crean's guidance of the program to success from "unthinkable depths" was regarded as one of the most remarkable rebuilding projects in NCAA basketball history. The Hoosiers advanced to the Sweet Sixteen in the 2012 NCAA tournament before losing a rematch game to Kentucky, who would go on to win the national championship. Following the surprise run to the Sweet Sixteen, the 2012–2013 Hoosiers spent 10 weeks ranked No. 1 in the country, and all but two weeks in the top 5. The experience of Jordan Hulls and Christian Watford, alongside the talent of Victor Oladipo, Cody Zeller and freshman point guard Yogi Ferrell, led this team to a finish of outright Big Ten regular season champions for the first time since 2002. They again advanced to the Sweet Sixteen, the first time since the 1992–93 and 1993–94 seasons that the Hoosiers advanced to the Sweet Sixteen in back-to-back seasons. As national player of the year, Oladipo and Zeller both left for the NBA after the conclusion of the season.

After a rough start, the 2015–2016 Hoosiers finished the season 27–8 overall and 15–3 in the Big Ten to win the Big Ten regular season title outright. They received the #1 seed in the 2016 Big Ten men's basketball tournament, where they made an early quarterfinals exit. As Big Ten Conference Champions, the Hoosiers received an at-large bid to the NCAA tournament and beat Chattanooga and Kentucky to advance to the Sweet 16 for the third time in five years; however, they fell to North Carolina in the next round. Despite the highs of the previous season and being ranked as high as #3 in the nation, the 2016–2017 team faced a troubling and disappointing year; they finished 18–16 overall and 7–11 in Big Ten play. After tying for tenth in the Big Ten, the Hoosiers missed out on the NCAA tournament and lost in the first round of the NIT, their first appearance since 2005. On March 16, 2017, the Indiana Hoosiers Athletic's Department fired coach Tom Crean. He ended his tenure with the Hoosiers with an overall record of 166–135 (.551), three Sweet Sixteen appearances, and two regular season conference championships.

Archie Miller era (2017–2021) 
On March 27, 2017, Archie Miller was named the 29th head coach in the history of the men's basketball program. Miller's first season was a major remodeling job, starting with laying the foundation of a pack-line defense and valuing possessions. Early in the season, Miller stated practices were 75% defense, 25% offense. That scheme showed early and often, as the Hoosiers struggled mightily throughout the season to find any flow or rhythm on offense, despite the defense making leaps and bounds in the overall rankings of Division 1 basketball. With a surprising early second round loss in the 2018 Big Ten tournament to Rutgers, 67–76, and losing enough games to keep them out of both the NCAA tournament and NIT, including games in which they were favored, such as Indiana State and Fort Wayne, IU's first season under their new coach came to a disappointing close. They finished with an overall record of 16–15 and 9–9 in the Big Ten.

In 2018, Miller landed his first five star recruit when Romeo Langford committed to Indiana University. Langford, a McDonald's-All American and 2018 Indiana Mr. Basketball, was (according to ESPN) the 6th ranked player in the nation and number one high school player in Indiana. Despite getting off to a strong start of 12–2, which included 3 conference wins, the 2018–2019 Hoosiers struggled down the backstretch of the season. Riddled with injuries and the inability to shoot, IU lost 12 of 13 games before turning things around and finishing the regular season with a 4-game winning streak. Having put themselves back into the conversation for making the NCAA tournament for the first time in 3 years, the Hoosiers looked to knock off Ohio State in the Big Ten tournament. However, the Hoosiers fell short and lost to Ohio State, 75–79. IU was deemed one of the Last Four Out in the NCAA tournament, so they earned 1-seed in the NIT, where they advanced to the Quarterfinals before losing to Wichita State, 63–73. Thus, the Hoosiers' 119th season ended with an overall record of 19–16 and 8–12 in the Big Ten. The Hoosiers started off another strong campaign for the 2019–2020 season by going 11–1 before dropping back-to-back games in late December 2019 and early January 2020. During the bulk of the conference season, IU was able to win most of their home games (7–3), while stealing a few road games (2-8) to end their final season with an overall record of 20–12 and a conference record of 9–11. Indiana entered the Big Ten tournament as the 11-seed where they faced the 14-seeded Nebraska Cornhuskers. The first round matchup ended in an 89–64 IU victory, staging a second round matchup with 6-seed Penn State. However, on the morning of March 12, 2020, the Big Ten Conference announced that it would be cancelling the remaining tournament games due to the COVID-19 pandemic. Following suit, that afternoon, the NCAA announced that it was cancelling all winter and spring championships. This announcement officially, and abruptly, ended the Hoosiers' season, where they were expected to make the NCAA tournament for the first time in 4 years.

The 2020–21 season was another disappointing one as the Hoosiers finished the regular season 12–15 overall, 7–12 in the Big Ten. Indiana closed out the season on a 6-game losing streak, leaving them out of the NCAA and NIT tournaments. On March 15, 2021, Indiana University officially parted ways with Miller and began its search for the next men's head basketball coach.

Mike Woodson era (2021–Current) 
Just shy of two weeks after Archie Miller was fired, Indiana University announced on March 28, 2021, that former Indiana standout, Mike Woodson, would become the 30th head coach of the IU basketball program. In addition, former Ohio State head coach, Thad Matta, was hired on to be an associate athletic director in men's basketball administration.

Coach Woodson's first season at the helm saw a list of streaks come to an end for the Hoosiers. Indiana finished the season 21–14 overall, and 9–11 in conference play. Along the way, IU ended losing streaks to Purdue, Michigan, and Illinois. as the No. 9 seed, they also advanced to the semifinals of the Big Ten Conference tournament, something they had not done since 2013. They lost to Iowa, 77–80, the eventual tournament champions. The Hoosiers also heard their name called on Selection Sunday for the first time since 2016. After a six-year absence from the NCAA tournament, IU was selected as a No. 12 seed to play in the NCAA tournament First Four round in Dayton, Ohio. They knocked off No. 12 seed Wyoming to make it to the first round (Round of 64) where they lost to No. 5 seed St. Mary's.

The Hoosiers finished the '22-'23 regular season ranked No. 19 in the Associated Press poll. The team spent 15 weeks among the top-25 teams in the nation. The Hoosiers also captured a share of 2nd place in the Big Ten Conference with a 21-10 overall regular season record, 12-8 in Big Ten play, and the No. 3 seed in the Big Ten Conference tournament. IU advanced to the quarterfinals before losing a close game to Penn State. For the second year in a row, the team found themselves in the NCAA Tournament this time as a No. 4 seed, where they improved upon their performance last year by making it to the Round of 32 but falling to the No. 5 seed Miami (FL), 69-85.

Season-by-season records

Current roster
Note: Players' year is based on remaining eligibility. The NCAA did not count the 2020–21 season towards eligibility.

Facilities

Old Assembly Hall (1900–1917)
Indiana's first basketball home was the original Assembly Hall, and at the time it was known simply as the Men's Gymnasium. As a multi-purpose building it also hosted a number of other indoor sports and campus activities. The wood-frame structure was built in 1896 at a cost of $12,000 and had a seating capacity of 600, though many more would often pack inside to watch games. It was located on the east side of Owen Hall where a small Disabled Zone parking lot sits today on the south side of the Indiana Memorial Union building. The first basketball game was played on February 21, 1901, when Indiana lost to Butler 24–20. In March 1911 the gym hosted the first ever Indiana high school basketball tournament and was hosted by the IU Booster Club instead of the IHSAA. As basketball began to outgrow the facility, students went so far as to characterize the gym as a public menace and health risk. On January 13, 1917, Indiana played its final game in the gym with a win over Iowa State 29–13. The building was torn down in 1938.

Men's Gymnasium (1917–1928)

The Men's Gymnasium served as the home of the basketball team from 1917 to 1928. After the first few games spectators complained that they could not see the game because of opaque wooden backboards. As a result, the Nurre Mirror Plate Company in Bloomington was employed to create new backboards that contained one-and-a-half inch thick plate glass so that fans could see games without an obstructed view. As a result, it was the first facility in the country to use glass backboards. Due to growing popularity of the sport at the school the team eventually had to move to a larger arena. The facility is now used by the School of Public Health-Bloomington (formerly the School of Health, Physical Education, and Recreation, HPER).

IU Fieldhouse (1928–1960)

The IU Fieldhouse (now known as the William Leon Garrett Fieldhouse, named after Bill Garrett) hosted the basketball team from 1928 to 1960. Indiana star player (and later coach) Branch McCracken scored the first point in the facility with a free throw. During the team's 32 seasons there, it hosted two national championship teams, five conference titles, 20 different All-Americans, and three Big Ten Most Valuable Players. However, the growing popularity of the sport necessitated a move to a new facility.

New IU Fieldhouse (1960–1971)

The New IU Fieldhouse (later named the Gladstein Fieldhouse) was originally intended as an interim home for the men's basketball team. However, NCAA sanctions on the football program hobbled the school's finances, and the "New" Fieldhouse ended up hosting the team for 11 years from 1960 to 1971. It now serves as a state-of-the-art track and field facility.

Simon Skjodt Assembly Hall (1971–present)

The Hoosiers currently play at Simon Skjodt Assembly Hall (pronounced like Scott).  The 17,222-seat arena has been the home of the men's basketball team since 1972. The basketball floor is named Branch McCracken Court after the legendary Hoosier coach. The north end of the arena prominently displays the program's five national championship banners. Former head coach Bob Knight called the facility a "sacred place" for student fans and athletes. Basketball sportscaster Gus Johnson called Assembly Hall, "the Carnegie Hall of basketball."

Cook Hall (2010–present)
Cook Hall is a basketball practice facility that was completed in 2010 and is located next to Simon Skjodt Assembly Hall, connected by a tunnel.  Bill and Gayle Cook donated $15 million to the "For the Glory of Old IU" campaign, out of which came Cook Hall where the IU basketball team is able to engage in day-to-day operations. It contains the Pfau Shine Legacy Court, a museum space that chronicles the history of Indiana basketball with photographs, artifacts, trophies and interactive touch-screen kiosks. The 67,000-square-foot, three story facility features two practice courts, two locker rooms, two player lounges, a strength and conditioning area, coaches' offices, and meeting rooms.

Coaching history

Notable players and coaches 

Indiana does not retire numbers of former players, unlike many other college basketball programs.

1,000-point scorers
The Hoosiers currently have 53 players in their 1,000-point club.

Calbert Cheaney is the all-time leading scorer at Indiana University with 2,613 points. Cheaney was able to reach the 1,000-point milestone in just 53 games, the 4th quickest Hoosier to do so. Others of honorable mention include Don Schlundt (43 games), Archie Dees (47 games), Walt Bellamy (50 games), Mike Woodson and Jimmy Rayl (54 games), Joe Cooke and Jay Edwards (55 games), Bracey Wright (59 games), and rounding out the top 10 is Tom Bolyard (60 games).

National Players of the Year
 Kent Benson – 1976 (Helms Foundation)
 Scott May – 1976 (Naismith, Helms Foundation, Sporting News, NABC, Associated Press, UPI)
 Calbert Cheaney – 1993 (Wooden, Naismith, Sporting News, Oscar Robertson, NABC, Associated Press, UPI)
 Victor Oladipo – 2013 (Sporting News)

All-Americans
Indiana has a total of 46 players who have claimed All-American status, with 14 of them earning First-Team All-American.

 Everett Dean – 1921♦
 Jim Strickland – 1929
 Branch McCracken – 1930♦
 Vern Huffman – 1936♦
 Ken Gunning – 1937
 Ernie Andres – 1938, 1939♦
 Marv Huffman – 1940
 Bill Menke – 1940
 Andy Zimmer – 1942
 John Wallace – 1946
 Ralph Hamilton – 1947♦
 Lou Watson – 1950
 Bill Garrett – 1951
 Don Schlundt – 1953, 1954♦, 1955
 Bobby Leonard – 1954
 Archie Dees – 1957, 1958
 Walt Bellamy – 1960, 1961
 Jimmy Rayl – 1962, 1963
 Dick Van Arsdale – 1965
 Tom Van Arsdale – 1965
 George McGinnis – 1971
 Steve Downing – 1973
 Steve Green – 1974, 1975
 Quinn Buckner – 1975, 1976
 Scott May – 1975♦, 1976♦
 Kent Benson – 1975, 1976♦, 1977♦
 Mike Woodson – 1979, 1980
 Isiah Thomas – 1981♦
 Ted Kitchel – 1982, 1983
 Landon Turner – 1982
 Randy Wittman – 1983
 Steve Alford – 1986♦, 1987♦
 Jay Edwards – 1989
 Calbert Cheaney – 1991, 1992, 1993♦
 Damon Bailey – 1994
 Alan Henderson – 1995
 Brian Evans – 1996
 A. J. Guyton – 2000♦
 Kirk Haston – 2001
 Jared Jeffries – 2002
 Eric Gordon – 2008
 D. J. White – 2008
 Cody Zeller – 2013
 Victor Oladipo – 2013♦
 Yogi Ferrell – 2016
 Trayce Jackson-Davis – 2023♦

♦ Denotes Consensus First-Team All-American

Academic All-Americans
A total of 11 Hoosiers have been deemed Academic All-Americans.

 Dick Van Arsdale – 1964, 1965
 Tom Van Arsdale – 1965
 John Ritter – 1973
 Steve Green – 1974, 1975
 Kent Benson – 1976, 1977
 Wayne Radford – 1978
 Randy Wittman – 1982, 1983
 Uwe Blab – 1985
 Luke Recker – 1999
 Jordan Hulls – 2013
 Cody Zeller – 2013

McDonald's All-Americans
Indiana has recruited a total of 31 McDonald's All-Americans; the first coming in 1977 and the latest in 2019.

 Tom Baker – 1977
 Ray Tolbert – 1977
 Landon Turner – 1978
 Isiah Thomas – 1979
 John Flowers – 1981
 Daryl Thomas – 1983
 Delray Brooks – 1984
 Ricky Calloway – 1985
 Jay Edwards – 1987
 Eric Anderson – 1988
 Greg Graham – 1989
 Pat Graham – 1989
 Damon Bailey – 1990
 Alan Henderson – 1991
 Sherron Wilkerson – 1993
 Andrae Patterson – 1994
 Neil Reed – 1994
 Jason Collier – 1996
 Luke Recker – 1997
 Dane Fife – 1998
 Jared Jeffries – 2000
 Bracey Wright – 2002
 D. J. White – 2004
 Eric Gordon – 2007
 Cody Zeller – 2011
 Yogi Ferrell – 2012
 Noah Vonleh – 2013
 James Blackmon Jr. – 2014
 Thomas Bryant – 2015
 Romeo Langford – 2018
 Trayce Jackson-Davis – 2019

Indiana Mr. Basketball
29 Indiana Mr. Basketball honorees have played for Indiana.

 Ed Schienbein – 1940
 Tom Schwartz – 1945
 Bill Garrett – 1947
 Bob Masters – 1948
 Hallie Bryant – 1953
 Jimmy Rayl – 1959
 Tom Van Arsdale – 1961
 Dick Van Arsdale – 1961
 George McGinnis – 1969
 Dave Shepherd - 1970
 Kent Benson – 1973
 Ray Tolbert – 1977
 Steve Bouchie – 1979
 Steve Alford – 1983
 Delray Brooks – 1984
 Jay Edwards – 1987
 Lyndon Jones – 1987
 Pat Graham – 1989
 Damon Bailey – 1990
 Luke Recker – 1997
 Tom Coverdale – 1998
 Jared Jeffries – 2000
 A.J. Ratfliff – 2004
 Eric Gordon – 2007
 Jordan Hulls – 2009
 Cody Zeller – 2011
 Romeo Langford – 2018
 Trayce Jackson-Davis – 2019
 Anthony Leal – 2020

Coaching honors
National Coach of the Year

 Branch McCracken – 1940, 1953
 Bob Knight – 1975, 1989 (Henry Iba Award, UPI)
 Bob Knight – 1975, 1976, 1989 (Associated Press)
 Bob Knight – 1987 (Naismith College Coach of the Year)
 Tom Crean – 2012 (ESPN.com)

Big Ten Coach of the Year

 Bob Knight – 1975, 1976, 1980, 1981, 1989
 Tom Crean – 2016

Big Ten Conference honors
Big Ten Player of the Year

 Don Schlundt – 1953
 Archie Dees – 1957, 1958
 Steve Downing – 1973
 Scott May – 1975, 1976
 Kent Benson – 1977
 Mike Woodson – 1980
 Ray Tolbert – 1981
 Randy Wittman – 1983
 Steve Alford – 1986, 1987
 Calbert Cheaney – 1993
 Brian Evans – 1996
 A. J. Guyton – 2000
 Kirk Haston – 2001
 Jared Jeffries – 2002
 D. J. White – 2008

Big Ten Freshman of the Year

 Dean Garrett – 1987
 Jay Edwards – 1988
 Eric Anderson – 1989
 Damon Bailey – 1991
 A. J. Guyton – 1997
 Jared Jeffries – 2001
 D. J. White – 2005
 Eric Gordon – 2008
 Cody Zeller – 2012
 Noah Vonleh – 2014
 Jalen Hood-Schifino – 2023

Naismith Memorial Basketball Hall of Famers

 Branch McCracken, inducted in 1960 as a player
 Everett Dean, inducted in 1966 as a coach
 Bob Knight, inducted in 1991 as a coach
 Walt Bellamy, inducted in 1993 as a player
 Isiah Thomas, inducted in 2000 as a player
 Bobby "Slick" Leonard, inducted in 2014 as a coach
 George McGinnis, inducted in 2017 as a player

National Collegiate Basketball Hall of Famers

 Everett Dean, inducted in 2006 as a coach
 Branch McCracken, inducted in 2006 as a player
 Bob Knight, inducted in 2006 as a coach
 Isiah Thomas, inducted in 2006 as a player
 Walt Bellamy, inducted in 2006 as a player
 Quinn Buckner, inducted in 2015 as a player
 Scott May, inducted in 2017 as a player
 Calbert Cheaney, inducted in 2019 as a player
 1975-76 Indiana Hoosiers men's basketball team, inducted in 2020 as a team

Current NBA players
 Eric Gordon (Los Angeles Clippers)
 Victor Oladipo (Miami Heat)
 Cody Zeller (Miami Heat)
 Thomas Bryant (Denver Nuggets)
 OG Anunoby (Toronto Raptors)
 Romeo Langford (San Antonio Spurs)

Olympians

School records

Conferences

Record vs. Big Ten opponents

Updated March 11, 2023

Team season records

Individual career

Career leaders
Updated through 2022–23 season

Postseason appearances
Indiana has won five NCAA Championships in men's basketball (1940, 1953, 1976, 1981, 1987) — the first two under coach Branch McCracken and the latter three under Bob Knight — and 22 Big Ten Conference championships. The Hoosiers' five NCAA Championships are tied with Duke (5) for the fourth-most in history, trailing only UCLA (11), Kentucky (8), and North Carolina (6). Their eight trips to the Final Four ranks eighth (tied) on the all-time list. The Hoosiers have made 41 appearances in the NCAA Division I men's basketball tournament (sixth-most in NCAA history).  In those 41 appearances, Indiana has posted a 68–36 record (.654).  Its 68 victories are the seventh-most in NCAA history. The Hoosiers are ranked 8th for the longest streak of NCAA tournament appearances at 18 (1986–2003). The Hoosiers also won post-season tournaments in 1974, the Collegiate Commissioners Association Tournament, and in 1979, the National Invitation Tournament. As of 2023, the 1976 Hoosiers remain the last NCAA men's basketball team to go undefeated in both regular season and postseason play.

NCAA tournament
Championship Results

NCAA Men's MOP Award
1940 – Marvin Huffman
1976 – Kent Benson
1981 – Isiah Thomas
1987 – Keith Smart

NCAA tournament seeding history
The NCAA began seeding the tournament with the 1979 edition.

Complete NCAA tournament results
The Hoosiers have appeared in the NCAA tournament 41 times. Their combined record is 68–36.

NIT results
The Hoosiers have appeared in the National Invitation Tournament (NIT) six times. Their combined record is 10–5. They were NIT champions in 1979.

CCAT results
The Hoosiers appeared in one of the only two ever Collegiate Commissioners Association tournaments. Their record is 3–0 and were champions in 1974.

Big Ten regular season championships
Indiana has won 22 Big Ten regular-season championships, the second-most in Big Ten history.

Tournament titles

Key statistics

Rankings
Indiana teams have spent a total of 54 weeks ranked number 1, most recently in 2013.

The Associated Press began its basketball poll on January 20, 1949. The following is a summary of those annual polls. Starting in the 1961–62 season, AP provided a preseason (PS) poll. AP did a post-tournament poll in 1953, 1954, 1974 and 1975. The following table summarizes Indiana history in the AP Poll:

Victories over AP number 1 teams
Indiana has eight victories over the AP number one ranked team, including the 2011 Kentucky upset.

Mar. 22, 1984 – NR IU 73, No. 1 North Carolina 68 (Omni Coliseum, Atlanta, Georgia)
Mar. 28, 1987 – No. 3 IU 97, No. 1 UNLV 93 (Louisiana Superdome, New Orleans, Louisiana)
Dec. 4, 1993 – No. 11 IU 96, No. 1 Kentucky, 84 (Hoosier Dome, Indianapolis, Indiana)
Jan. 7, 2001 – NR IU 59, No. 1 Michigan State 58 (Assembly Hall, Bloomington, Indiana)
Mar. 21, 2002 – NR IU 74, No. 1 Duke 73 (Rupp Arena, Lexington, Kentucky)
Dec. 10, 2011 – NR IU 73, No. 1 Kentucky 72 (Assembly Hall, Bloomington, Indiana)
Feb. 2, 2013 – No. 3 IU 81, No. 1 Michigan 73 (Assembly Hall, Bloomington, Indiana)
Feb. 4, 2023 - No. 21 IU 79, No. 1 Purdue 74 (Simon Skjodt Assembly Hall, Bloomington, Indiana)

Radio network affiliates

See also
NCAA Division I men's basketball tournament records
NCAA Men's Division I Final Four appearances by coaches
NCAA Men's Division I Final Four appearances by school
NCAA Division I men's basketball tournament consecutive appearances
NCAA Division I men's basketball tournament all-time team records

References

External links
 

 
Basketball teams established in 1900